Strasbourg Convention may refer to:
The 1963 Convention on the Unification of Certain Points of Substantive Law on Patents for Invention
The 1963 Convention on the Reduction of Cases of Multiple Nationality and on Military Obligations in Cases of Multiple Nationality 
The 1967 European Convention on the Adoption of Children 
The 1977 Convention on Products Liability in regard to Personal Injury and Death 
The 1981 Convention for the Protection of Individuals with regard to Automatic Processing of Personal Data 
The 1983 Convention on the Transfer of Sentenced Persons
The 1990 CETS141 (Convention on Laundering, Search, Seizure and Confiscation of the Proceeds from Crime) 
The 1997 European Convention on Nationality
The 1997 European Convention on the Suppression of Terrorism

See also
Strasbourg Agreement (disambiguation)
Strasbourg